The German 28 cm SK C/34 naval gun was a 283 mm 54.5-caliber built-up gun designed in 1934 used on the  and for the planned Landkreuzer P. 1000 Ratte super-heavy tank.

History 
The Scharnhorst class received an improved version of the SK C/28 which had a longer barrel—the SK C/34.

The 283 mm SK C/34 gun was relatively fast loading, compared with other armament of this size. It could deliver a shot every 17 seconds. The ballistic properties of the guns made them effective against the new French , which had an armored belt 225–283 mm, barbettes of 310–340 mm, at standard fighting distances.

An improved version of the gun was planned to be mounted on the Netherlands' Design 1047 battlecruisers, but the ships were never begun due to the start of the Second World War.

When 's turrets were removed for re-arming and upgunning to 38 cm in 1942–43, her guns were redeployed for coast defence at Fjell festning ´(11.MAA 504) in Sotra, Norway (Bruno turret), at Batterie Oerlandat (4.MAA 507) in Austrått, Norway (Cesar turret), and guns from Anton turret were installed at Battery Rozenburg in the Netherlands.

Characteristics

Ammunition

Characteristics of SK C/28 and SK C/34 283 mm shells:

Surviving examples

 Gneisenaus Cäsar turret with its 3 guns survives at Austrått fort, Ørlandet, Norway
 Parts of the guns from Anton turret survive at former "Stichting Fort", Hook of Holland

See also
 List of naval guns

Footnotes
Notes

Citations

External links 

 
 

 

Naval guns of Germany
280 mm artillery
World War II naval weapons
Coastal artillery
Military equipment introduced in the 1930s